Sir Philip Henry Manning Dowson  (16 August 1924 – 22 August 2014) was a leading British architect. He served as President of the Royal Academy from 1993 to 1999.

Early life
Philip Dowson was born in South Africa. Having moved to England, he was educated at Gresham's School in Holt, Norfolk, from 1938 to 1942 and then went up to University College, Oxford (where he later designed four student accommodation blocks for Stavertonia in North Oxford), to read Mathematics. This was during the Second World War. After one year in Oxford, he joined the Royal Navy and remained in the service until 1947.

On leaving the Navy, Dowson proceeded to Clare College, Cambridge, to study Art from 1947 to 1950, and then to the Architectural Association School in London.

Career
From 1953, Dowson worked with the engineer Sir Ove Arup, becoming a founding partner in Arup Associates in 1963 and rising to be the firm's senior partner and Chief Architect in 1969.

Dowson contributed to a large number of major projects, including new buildings for the Universities of Oxford and Cambridge. He died on 22 August 2014, aged 90.

National Life Stories conducted an oral history interview (C467/71) with Dowson in 2002 for its Architects' Lives collection, held by the British Library.

Honours
 1969 — Commander of the Order of the British Empire
 1980 — Knighthood
 1981 — Royal Academician
 1981 — Royal Gold Medal of the Royal Institute of British Architects
 1993 — President of the Royal Academy of Arts

Dowson also served as a Trustee of the National Portrait Gallery.

References

1924 births
2014 deaths
People educated at Gresham's School
Alumni of University College, Oxford
Alumni of Clare College, Cambridge
Alumni of the Architectural Association School of Architecture
Royal Navy officers of World War II
20th-century English architects
Royal Academicians
Commanders of the Order of the British Empire
Knights Bachelor
Recipients of the Royal Gold Medal